Kista metro station is a station on the blue line of the Stockholm metro, located in the district of Kista, northern Stockholm. It was opened on 5 June 1977 as part of the extension from Hallonbergen to Akalla. The station is the only one on the blue line above ground.

Gallery

References

External links

Images of Kista

Blue line (Stockholm metro) stations
Railway stations opened in 1977
1977 establishments in Sweden